MTV Dropout Pvt Ltd is a youth-based reality television show on MTV India. The show first aired in July 2017. In the show, a group of dropouts participate in various tasks that seemingly challenge their physical and mental strength.

Auditions

The auditions of this reality TV show were conducted in Mumbai and New Delhi by popular VJ's Raghu Ram, Rajiv Laxman & entrepreneurs Sandeep Aggarwal (co-founder of ShopClues), Anisha Singh & Alok Kejriwal.

Series details

Season 1

There were 13 contestants in the Season 1:

 Aakanksha Singh  
 Agha Khan 
 Ajay Vishnu
 Amit Miglani  
 Bobby Pratap  
 Geetika Bahl  
 Harsha Vardhan 
 Karmaditya Bagga  
 Priyansha Jain  
 Roshni Ali 
 Rubaina Surya 
 Sayan Chakraborty  
 Shiv Kumar Sharma

References

Indian reality television series
MTV (Indian TV channel) original programming
2017 Indian television series debuts